Southowram is a village in Calderdale, West Yorkshire, England that stands on the hill top to the east of Halifax, on the south side of Shibden valley. The village falls within the Town ward of Calderdale Council. It is a small Pennine village near Bank Top, Brookfoot and Siddal. Northowram is on the northern side of the valley and is roughly equidistant from Halifax and Brighouse.

History
The parish of Southowram was recorded on 1 July 1837 as part of the Halifax Registration District. It was abolished as a distinct parish on 1 April 1937, with the parish being split between Brighouse and Elland.

Parts of the village centre were demolished and rebuilt in the 1970s and 1980s. But many older buildings remain, as do the ancient stocks on Towngate. Old buildings were lost on New Street and were replaced by council housing. More such housing is to be found in the lower part of the village. Southowram retains in the main, however, a mixture of older historic and new housing, council owned and private housing.

A number of old halls and farms which survived until the 1940s and 1950s were lost in subsequent decades.

A National School was built in 1839 and also served as the Sunday school for the church of St Anne in the Grove opposite. The architecture employs Gothic pointed arches but Tudor-style chimneys. In the centre of the front wall are two blocked doorways with round heads. There is also a carved stone plaque, the inscription on which includes "National School".

Landmarks

Law Hill House

In 1837, at the age of 19, Emily Brontë came to teach at the three-storey house on Law Lane which was then an exclusive boarding school. She stayed for only about six months, however, because of the strict lifestyle demanded. She was homesick and in a collection of letters, her sister Charlotte wrote about how Emily had to work from 6 a.m. to 11 p.m. each day and was more of a governess than a teacher. Emily wrote poetry while at Law Hill and became fascinated by the story of intrigue and feuding which surrounded the house's builder, Jack Sharp, and his near neighbours, the Walker family of Walterclough Hall. It is said she reflected the story in the plot of her novel Wuthering Heights and that the central character Heathcliff was based on Sharp himself. A plaque on the wall commemorates Brontë's stay between 1837 and 1838.

Industries
Local industries have included farming, mining for coal and fireclay, brick-manufacture, and stone quarrying and mining. With the exception of farming, and quarrying, which is continued by Marshalls plc, these industries are more or less defunct. Marshalls continues to extract stone in the area and the company has moved its headquarters to Huddersfield in recent years. However, the quarries at Brookfoot Lane remain open.

A number of walls which incorporate quarry waste can still be seen in the locality, especially those on the valley opposite Hove Edge. These walls include a rather splendid set of steps set into the side of the valley, which lead into a small narrow ginnel to permit passage along a public footpath.

Religion

The Anglican church of St Anne's, situated below the village proper, surrounded by trees and fields, is an old stone-built church with a bell tower with a clock. It is the only remaining place of worship in the village. Originally situated as part of a house belonging to the lord of the manor, Pope Eugenius IV issued a licence in 1440 to enable the Mass to be offered. The legal name of the parish is "St Anne-in-the-Grove, Southowram". The church was restored in 2006 after a four-year appeal. It features a beautiful rood cross and icon as well as a gallery, a fine carved stone pulpit and some fine stained-glass windows.

Various non-conformist chapels have closed over the years, most recent being Southowram Methodist Church, which was located at the lower end of Chapel Lane. The building has now been converted to apartments, but the graveyard survives. Although the Methodist chapel building has been closed the Methodist Church in Southowram continues to meet for worship and other activities in the village Community Centre. In 2010 Southowram Methodist Church combined with Boothtown Methodist and the name was changed to Boothtown and Southowram Methodist Church.

Sport
Southowram is home to Southowram Cricket Club, who play at Ashday Lane, and Beacon Rangers who play on Beacon Hill. Beacon Rangers are a junior team only whereas the cricket club is home to three senior teams and U11, U13, U15 & U17 teams at junior level. All senior teams played in their respective premier divisions until the 2009 season, where all three senior teams were relegated. The club's first and second teams play in the Halifax Cricket League.

The 'new' Southowram CC was originally a pub team based at The Cock and Bottle Inn at the other end of the village. In 2002, Southowram CC celebrated their 25th anniversary year by winning the right to host the Parish Cup final.

Education and amenities
The local school, Withinfields Primary School, is in the centre of the village, on Law Lane and is a feeder school for Brighouse High School. The school was relocated and re-built in 1997 when the old school, being inadequate for modern needs, was demolished. The former school site is now part of a housing estate. The new school has been built so that it can easily be expanded if and when the village should expand.

There is a library on Law Lane at the centre of the village.

"The Shoulder of Mutton" on Cain Lane was a popular public house, currently empty. The Pack Horse public house, also on Cain Lane, at the centre of the village, was in 2016 converted to an Indian restaurant, but in 2017 reverted to a thriving public house, serving food.

Notable residents
Arthur "Ashworth" Aspinall (1846-1929), founder of Scots College in Sydney, was born here. 
 William Swinden Barber (1832–1908), architect, was born here.

References

External links

 Mines around Southowram
 North Owram in "A concise history of the parish and vicarage of Halifax, in the county of York" by John Crabtree, published 1836
 Southowram Chapelry at genuki.org
 Southowram Cricket Club Website

Geography of Calderdale
Villages in West Yorkshire
Areas of Halifax, West Yorkshire